Cudgee is a locality in south west Victoria, Australia.

The formally recognised traditional owners for the area in which Cudgee sits are groups within the Eastern Maar peoples, who are represented by the Eastern Maar Aboriginal Corporation (EMAC).

References

External links

Towns in Victoria (Australia)